Uttamchand Khatik (1950–2016) was an Indian politician and a member of legislative assembly of Madhya Pradesh. He was representing Naryoli (Vidhan Sabha constituency) of Madhya Pradesh.
Uttamchand was a senior Congress leader and died in 2016 at the age of 66. He was the younger brother of former Member of Parliament Shankar Lal Khatik.

References

1950 births
2016 deaths
Madhya Pradesh MLAs 1980–1985
Indian National Congress politicians from Madhya Pradesh
People from Sagar district